William Sullivan Peirce (May 16, 1864 – July 10, 1923) was a United States Army officer in the late 19th and early 20th centuries. In World War I, he commanded the Springfield Armory. He attained the rank of brigadier general, and after the war served as the Army's Assistant Chief of Ordnance.

Biography
Peirce was born on May 16, 1864, in Burlington, Vermont. He studied at the University of Vermont from 1881 to 1884 and took part in the school's military instruction program, where he attained the rank of cadet sergeant major. He then began studies at the United States Military Academy. He graduated from West Point in 1888 ranked eighth of 44, and was appointed a second lieutenant of Field Artillery. In 1892 he was transferred to the Ordnance Department, serving at the Watervliet Arsenal, the Sandy Hook Proving Ground, the Rock Island Arsenal and the Springfield Arsenal.

In September 1912 he was put in charge of the Springfield Armory. After the American entry into World War I Peirce was transferred to Washington, D.C., where he was serving as chief of the Administration Division and assistant Chief of Ordnance. Peirce was promoted to brigadier general in 1918. Peirce received the Army Distinguished Service Medal in recognition of his wartime achievements.

Death and burial
Peirce died at a Washington, D.C. hospital on July 10, 1923. He was buried at Lakeview Cemetery in Burlington, Vermont.

Awards
Peirce received the Army Distinguished Service Medal for his actions during World War I, the citation for which reads:

In addition, Peirce was awarded the French Legion of Honor (Officer).

Family
In 1890, Peirce married Lula Abercrombie of Pensacola, Florida. They were the parents of four children, Gladys, Marjorie, Albert, and Dorothy. They divorced in March 1911, and in April, Peirce married Harriet Roberts. They remained married until his death.

References

Bibliography

External links

1864 births
1923 deaths
People from Burlington, Vermont
United States Military Academy alumni
Recipients of the Distinguished Service Medal (US Army)
Officiers of the Légion d'honneur
United States Army generals of World War I
United States Army generals
Burials at Lakeview Cemetery (Burlington, Vermont)
Military personnel from Vermont